The Square Castan is a set of archaeological remains from the antique Gallo-Roman city of Vesontio, which is now the French city of Besançon.

Description
The square is a vast unidentified semi-circular set, probably from the 2nd or 3rd century. It's located next to the triumphal arch "Porte Noire". 

The Saint-Jean-Baptiste church stood on the site of the square until the French Revolution. The church was destroyed between 1794 and 1797.

Archaeologist and librarian Auguste Castan launched excavations in 1870. He discovered 8 Corinthian columns, remains of the water distribution pond which collected the water brought by the Roman aqueduct of Arcier, and the remains of a hemicycle that has an inner diameter of 54 meters.

What was it?
Auguste Castan identified it with the antique theater of Vesontio. The hemicycle may also have constituted a podium which supported the colonnade of an overcast portico: it delimits a raised esplanade whose exact function is unknown at the present time.

An English garden
An English archaeological garden was created in 1870 to brighten up the remains. It was opened to the public in 1874 and took the name of Auguste Castan in 1898.

Pictures

Roman sites in France
Buildings and structures in Besançon
Tourist attractions in Besançon